Tichina is a given name. Notable people with the name include:

Tichina Arnold (born 1969), American actress, comedian, and singer
Tichina Vaughn (born 1965), American operatic mezzo-soprano

Feminine given names